The following is a timeline of the history of the municipality of Leiden, Netherlands.

Prior to 20th century

 11th C. - Burcht van Leiden (an old shell keep).
 1323 - School active (approximate date).
 1377 - Hooglandse Kerk (church) construction begins.
 1390
 Public clock installed (approximate date).
 Pieterskerk (church) construction begins.
 1420 - Leiden#Siege of 1420 Siege of 1420.
 1483 - Printing press in operation.
 1520 - Roman ruin Brittenburg discovered near Leiden.
 1566 - August: Iconoclasm by Protestants.
 1572 - Protestant sermonizing begins at the Vrouwekerk.
 1573 - Siege of Leiden by Spanish forces begins.
 1574 - 3 October: Siege of Leiden ends.
 1575
 Leiden University founded.
 Leiden University Library founded.
 1577 - Flemish textile manufacturers move to Leiden.
 1578 - Gemeenlandshuis van Rijnland (water management building) purchased.
 1580s - "Immigration of Flemings, Walloons, and Brabanters" to Leiden.
 1580 - Printer Elsevier in business.
 1581 -  in use.
 1587 - Hortus Botanicus Leiden (garden) founded.
 1594
 Leiden anatomical theatre established.
 Turkish tulips planted in the Hortus Botanicus.
 1598 -  built.
 1600 -  built.
 1606 - 15 July: Birth of Rembrandt van Rijn.
 1612 - Stads Timmerhuis built.
 1622 - Population: 44,745.
 1630s - Fijnschilders (artists) active.
 1633 - Leiden Observatory established.
 1639 - Marekerk (a Protestant church) founded.
 1640 - Population: 100,000. (estimate) 
 1641 - Laecken-Halle (cloth hall) built.
 1648 - Leiden Guild of Saint Luke established.
 1655 - Bibliotheca Thysiana (library) established.
 1658 - Weigh House built.
 1683 -  bookseller in business.
 1723 -  established.
 1745 - Electricity-storing "Leyden jar" invented.
 1766 - Maatschappij der Nederlandse Letterkunde and Kunst Wordt door Arbeid Verkreegen literary societies formed.
 1800 - Population: 30,000. (estimate) 
 1807 - 12 January: Leiden Gunpowder Disaster.
 1818 - National Museum of Antiquities established.
 1820 - National Museum of Natural History founded.
 1837 - National Museum of Ethnology founded.
 1838 - Stedelijk Gymnasium Leiden (school) active.
 1842 - Leiden Centraal railway station opened.
 1848 - E. J. Brill publisher in business.
 1851 - Sijthoff publisher in business.
 1860 - Leiden Observatory re-built in the Hortus Botanicus Leiden.
 1864 - Training college for Dutch East Indies civil servants established (later the Royal Netherlands Institute of Southeast Asian and Caribbean Studies).
 1873 - Remonstrant seminary active.
 1874 - Municipal Museum of Antiquities established.
 1893 -  (city archive) building constructed.

20th century

 1904
  begins publication.
 Population: 56,044.
 1919 - Population: 61,408.
 1923 -  (bridge) built.
 1925 - St. Joseph, Leiden (Roman Catholic parish church) built.
 1928 - University Hospital built.
 1931
 Leidse Hout (public urban park) opened.
 Museum Boerhaave established.
 1940 - Town Hall rebuilt.
 1946 -  becomes mayor.
 1978 - 1978 Tour de France cycling race starts from Leiden.
 1980
  becomes mayor.
 Population: 103,046 municipality.
 1984 - Leiden Bio Science Park development begins.

21st century

 2003 -  becomes mayor.
 2006 - Leiden University Medical Center built.
 2012 -  built.
 2013
 Welch Allyn branch office in business.
 Population: 119,800 municipality.
 2017 - Asian Library opened by Queen Máxima of the Netherlands.

See also
 Leiden history
 
 
 
 Timelines of other municipalities in the Netherlands: Amsterdam, Breda, Delft, Eindhoven, Groningen, Haarlem, The Hague, 's-Hertogenbosch, Maastricht, Nijmegen, Rotterdam, Utrecht

References

This article incorporates information from the Dutch Wikipedia.

Bibliography

in English
Published in the 18th-19th c.
 
 
 
 
 

  (+ 1851 ed.)

Published in the 20th-21st c.
 
 (+ 1881 ed.)

in Dutch
  1910-1918
  (province and city)

External links

 Europeana. Items related to Leiden, various dates.
 Digital Public Library of America. Items related to Leiden, various dates

 
Leiden
Years in the Netherlands